Theobalds Brook is a minor tributary of the River Lea which rises in the hills south of Goffs Oak in Hertfordshire, England.

Rivers of Hertfordshire
Tributaries of the River Lea
1Theolbalds